Rowland Alston (7 June 1782 – 21 November 1865) was an English Whig politician.

He was a Member of Parliament (MP) for Hertfordshire from 1835 to 1841. He lived at Pishiobury, Sawbridgeworth, Hertfordshire.

References 
 

1782 births
1865 deaths
Members of the Parliament of the United Kingdom for Hertfordshire
UK MPs 1835–1837
UK MPs 1837–1841